Faraz Kamalvand (born 26 December 1976) is an Iranian football coach. He is headcoach of  Kheybar Khorramabad

Early life
He was born on 27 December 1976 in Khoramabad, Iran and is from Lorestan. From 1998 to 2001, He worked for Abrarvarzeshi Newspaper and was a sport journalist. He learned coaching with Firouz Karimi. Karimi nominated him to PAS Tehran chairman, Hamid Malahi as club's Under-19 team. With PAS, he won club's first under-19 championship. He was Assistant manager of Esteghlal Ahvaz along with Karimi in 2002.

Coaching career
Kamalvand is youngest head coach history of Iran Pro League He became famous after coaching Shirin Faraz and promoting to Persian Gulf Cup in 2006-07 season. He was appointed as the Tractor manager in the summer of 2008. Tractor won 2008–09 Azadegan League and promoted to Iran Pro League with Kamalvand after eight years. The best result of Tractor in the highest Iranian division under his coaching was fifth in 2010-11 Persian Gulf Cup. In June 2011, Kamalvand's contract expired and Amir Ghalenoei was appointed as Tractor's coach on 13 June 2011 He was named as PAS Hamedan F.C.'s new head coach on 18 June 2011. He resigned on 18 January 2012 after some bad results and was appointed as new head coach of Shahrdari Tabriz on 14 June 2012 and then On 4 October 2014, Kamalvand officially took over as the head coach of Gostaresh.
after 3 seasons He joined at the Sanaat Naft as head coach.
Kamalvand achieved the best result in the history of Gostaresh and Sanaat Naft in Persian Gulf Pro League in 2016-17 and 2017-18.

Then after a season in the Azadegan League with Gol Reyhan Alborz F.C. and Aluminium Arak, he returned to the Persian Gulf Pro League with Pars Jonoubi.

Statistics

Honours 
Shirin Faraz
Azadegan League (1): 2006–07

Tractor
Azadegan League (1): 2008–09

References

External links

1975 births
Living people
People from Khorramabad
Iranian football managers
Tractor S.C. managers
Pas Hamedan F.C. managers
Sanat Naft Abadan F.C. managers
Persian Gulf Pro League managers
Shahin Bushehr F.C. managers